Static Nocturne is a limited edition mini-album from Portland, OR ambient musician Matthew Cooper, under the name Eluvium, following the release of his EP Leaves Eclipse the Light. This mini-album is the first Eluvium album to be self-released on his own label Watership Sounds, and is available for purchase officially from his own web store.
The album is limited to 200 hand assembled copies. The music is described by the artist as "an homage to static / white noise."
The album, which features one 50-minute-long track, was made available for pre-order on September 15 from the said web store.

Track listing 
 Static Nocturne - 50:08

References 

2010 albums
Eluvium (musician) albums